The Royal Navy is the United Kingdom's navy.

Royal Navy may also refer to:

Past

In Europe
 Austro-Hungarian Navy (Kaiserliche und Königliche Kriegsmarine), a navy from 1786 to 1918
 Regia Marina ("Royal Navy"), Italy's navy from 1861 to 1946
 Royal Sardinian Navy
 Royal Scots Navy, a navy from the Middle Ages to 1707
 Real Marina, Royal Sicilian Navy
 Royal Yugoslav Navy (Југословенска краљевска ратна морнарица), a navy from 1918 to 1941

Elsewhere
 Royal Indian Navy, a navy from 1612 to 1950

Present

In Asia
 Royal Brunei Navy (Tentera Laut Diraja Brunei)
 Royal Malaysian Navy (Tentera Laut DiRaja Malaysia)
 Royal Navy of Oman (البحرية السلطانية العمانية)
 Royal Saudi Navy (القوات البحرية الملكية السعودية)
 Royal Thai Navy (กองทัพเรือ)

In Europe
 Royal Danish Navy (Søværnet)
 Royal Netherlands Navy (Koninklijke Marine)
 Royal Norwegian Navy (Sjøforsvaret)
 Royal Swedish Navy (Kungliga Flottan)

Elsewhere
 Royal Australian Navy
 Royal Canadian Navy
 Royal Moroccan Navy (القوات البحرية الملكية المغربية)
 Royal New Zealand Navy